Peter Voss, Thief of Millions (German: Peter Voss, der Millionendieb) may refer to:

 Peter Voss, Thief of Millions (novel), a comedy crime novel by Ewald Gerhard Seeliger 
  Peter Voss, Thief of Millions (1921 film), a silent film directed by Georg Jacoby
  Peter Voss, Thief of Millions (1932 film), a film directed by E.A. Dupont
  Peter Voss, Thief of Millions (1946 film), a film directed by Karl Anton
  Peter Voss, Thief of Millions (1958 film), a film directed by Wolfgang Becker
  Peter Voss, Thief of Millions (TV series), a 1977 television series

See also
 Peter Voss, Hero of the Day, a 1959 film